The Union Station of Louisville, Kentucky is a historic railroad station that serves as offices for the Transit Authority of River City (TARC), as it has since mid-April 1980 after receiving a year-long restoration costing approximately $2 million. It was one of at least five union stations in Kentucky, amongst others located in Lexington, Covington, Paducah and Owensboro. It was one of three stations serving Louisville, the others being Central Station and Southern Railway Station. It superseded previous, smaller, railroad depots located in Louisville, most notably one located at Tenth and Maple in 1868-1869, and another L&N station built in 1858. The station was formally opened on September 7, 1891 by the Louisville and Nashville Railroad. There was a claim made at the time that it was the largest railroad station in the Southern United States, covering forty acres (16 ha). The other major station in Louisville was Central Station, serving the Baltimore and Ohio, the Illinois Central and other railroads.

Construction
Construction of the station began in 1880, but completion was delayed until 1889 due to rising costs totaling at $310,656.47. Local contractors constructed all but the clock tower. Architect Col Henry C. Wolters is credited with the design and supervision of the original structure. Architect F. W. Mowbray was specifically hired for the project, which was to reflect the Richardsonian Romanesque style of architecture. Its exterior was made of limestone ashlar, mostly from Bowling Green, Kentucky, although that from Bedford, Indiana was used for its trim. The roof was made of a slate covering protecting iron and heavy wood. Architectural features include a clock tower, smaller towers, turrets, a facade of considerable size, and barreled vaulting. This station was a street-running station.

The interior was no less impressive. The atrium, dining, and ladies' retiring rooms on the first floor were quite spacious. A wrought iron balcony overlooked the atrium. Soft lighting of the facility came from rose-colored windows on both sides of the atrium. The walls were made of marble from Georgia, as well as oak and southern pine. Ceramic tiles covered the floor.

History

Union Station provided the entrance to Louisville for many visitors, with its height being the 1920s, when it served 58 trains a day. As a Union Station, it served not only the L&N railroad, but also the Monon Railroad, the Pennsylvania Railroad and the Louisville, Henderson, & St. Louis, the latter eventually merging with the L&N. Many of those traveling to the Kentucky Derby would use the Union Station as their first place of celebration, with twenty special trains coming to the facility, and Pullman cars allowing overnight accommodations, a trend that continued until the mid-1960s.

Three separate United States presidents arrived in Louisville by Union Station. The lobby was once graced by a performance by Sarah Bernhardt.

On July 17, 1905, a fire occurred in the facility. The structure was unusable until it reopened the following December. A temporary structure was used in its place during the restoration. The rose-colored windows were replaced due to the fire with an 84-paneled stained glass skylight that became a feature of the barrel-vaulting tower. The Ohio River flood of 1937 also saw the structure close for twelve days.

Amtrak used the facility regularly from May 1971 until October 1976, when it began running the Floridian in conjunction with the Auto-Train from a suburban station near Louisville International Airport. This arrangement would last until the discontinuation of the Floridian. From December 4, 2001 to July 4, 2003, a track on the west side of the parking lot served Amtrak's Kentucky Cardinal, which ran to Chicago via Indianapolis. However, this effort to return intercity rail to Louisville failed. This was primarily because the Indianapolis-Louisville leg ran along jointed rail that limited its speed to 30 mph, slower than automobile traffic along Interstate 65.

L&N would eventually sell Union Station to TARC, which spent two million dollars from 1979 to 1980 to restore it. Since then it has served as administration offices for TARC.

In October 2010, TARC announced plans to use a grant from the U.S. Department of Transportation to restore all 278 windows at the 120-year-old Union Station, including 40 made of stained glass. Union Station will also get a new geothermal-energy system. Combined with the window restoration, TARC estimates its energy savings will be $58,000 per year.

Major named trains served at the station
Until the 1950s and 1960s the station served several prominent trains.
Chicago, Indianapolis, and Louisville Railway (Monon Railroad):
Thoroughbred, – Chicago, Illinois – Louisville
Louisville & Nashville:
Azalean, New York, New York – New Orleans, Louisiana, with western branch to Memphis, Tennessee
Flamingo, (for a period in the 1940s) – Cincinnati, Ohio – Jacksonville, Florida
Florida Arrow (winter train, pooled with the Pennsylvania Railroad and others), Chicago–Miami (and Sarasota and St. Petersburg)
Humming Bird, Cincinnati, Ohio – New Orleans
Pan-American, New York, New York – New Orleans
South Wind, Chicago – Miami, Florida
unnamed trains to St. Louis via Evansville
unnamed trains to Lexington, Kentucky via Frankfort, Kentucky
Pennsylvania Railroad (PRR):
Kentuckian, Chicago – Louisville
Union, Chicago – Louisville branch (diverting from Chicago-Cincinnati branch at Logansport, Indiana)
Connecting PRR trains to Indianapolis for St. Louis, Missouri – New York City trains:
American, Metropolitan, Penn Texas and St. Louisan
Connecting PRR train to Fort Wayne for:
Northern Arrow (Mackinaw City, Michigan – Cincinnati)

See also

List of attractions and events in the Louisville metropolitan area
Union Station (Owensboro, Kentucky)
Humming Bird
Pan-American
South Wind
Floridian

References

External links

TARC History and Union Station
TARC gets $9 million in federal grants—Business First October 28, 2010

19th-century buildings and structures in Louisville, Kentucky
Louisville
Railway stations in the United States opened in 1891
National Register of Historic Places in Louisville, Kentucky
Transportation buildings and structures in Louisville, Kentucky
Louisville
Railway stations on the National Register of Historic Places in Kentucky
Clock towers in Kentucky
Louisville
Louisville
Louisville